Spyra is a surname. Notable people with the name include:

 Janusz Spyra (born 1958), Polish historian
 Wolfram Spyra (born 1964), German composer of ambient music

See also
 Spira (disambiguation)